Pedro R.S. (born August 9, 1946) is former Brazilian football player and manager.

Coaching career
In 1994, Pedro R.S. became goalkeeper coach for J1 League club; Shimizu S-Pulse under manager; Émerson Leão. In June, Émerson Leão resigned manager, Pedro R.S. managed J.League Cup as caretaker in July. However first match in J.League Cup on July 30, S-Pulse lost 1–3 to Yokohama Marinos and were eliminated from the tournament. So, the match he managed is only this match. In August, S-Pulse signed with new manager Rivellino, so Pedro R.S. returned to goalkeeper coach.

References

External links

1946 births
Living people
Brazilian footballers
Brazilian football managers
J1 League managers
Shimizu S-Pulse managers
Association footballers not categorized by position